Afonovskaya is a rural locality (a village) in Tarnogskoye Rural Settlement, Tarnogsky District, Vologda Oblast, Russia. The population was 147 as of 2002. There are 2 streets.

Geography 
Afonovskaya is located 10 km southeast of Tarnogsky Gorodok (the district's administrative centre) by road. Bovytinskaya is the nearest rural locality.

References 

Rural localities in Tarnogsky District